Oliver Twist is a 1997 American made-for-television film based on Charles Dickens’s 1838 novel of the same title. The film was directed by Tony Bill, written by Monte Merrick and Stephen Sommers, and produced by Walt Disney Television. It stars Richard Dreyfuss, Elijah Wood, David O'Hara, and Alex Trench as the titular character.

As in most film adaptations of this novel, Monks, Oliver's half-brother, is not in the film. There are other changes as well. The bookseller does not testify for Oliver at his trial, but Rose Maylie does. Most of the changes are minor, but a major one is that when Oliver is taken in by Fagin's gang he himself, and not the Widow Corney, is in possession of his mother's locket, and Oliver has come to London, not just to seek his fortune, but to discover his true identity. Mr. Bumble, Corney's assistant, is only in one scene, and the Widow Corney's role is expanded. And, as in the musical and the 1968 film Oliver!, Nancy is murdered at London Bridge, not in her bedroom as in the novel. Fagin is not sentenced to death but can escape.

Oliver Twist premiered on ABC as part of The Wonderful World of Disney on November 16, 1997.

Plot
A woman gives birth to a boy in an orphanage owned by the Widow Corney, dying as she does so. She leaves him a locket, containing a portrait of her mother, which Corney takes. Her assistant names the child Oliver Twist from his rotating alphabetical list of names. Six years later, Oliver, now working in the orphanage, requests to see his locket. Corney says he can have it when he’s twelve. Six years later, Oliver is forced on the night before his 12th birthday into drawing straws at dinner for who has to ask Corney for more food. After drawing the shortest one, she throws him out of the workhouse for daring to ask her such a question without his locket. He returns to steal it at night and heads out to London. Oliver has a meet with Dodger
  
Once there, Oliver, hungry, is stopped from stealing an apple by a young man named Jack Dawkins, also known as the Artful Dodger, who explains that he’s a professional thief and proud of his work. He offers to take Oliver in with the band of boys he lives with and his boss, Fagin, an old and sly man who teaches the group how to steal. Upon arriving, Fagin takes Oliver's locket as Oliver is dressed and welcomed. Oliver also meets Bill Sikes-a thief and murderer to whom Fagin owes an enormous sum-and his kind girlfriend, Nancy. Dodger begins to teach Oliver about the art of thievery that same day. At night, Oliver catches Fagin admiring his treasure which he keeps hidden in a box and is threatened with death if he steals from it. However, when asked, Fagin admits that it is where he is keeping Oliver's locket. Three months later, Oliver is sent out to pick his first pocket as Dodger orchestrates the plan. While stealing a watch, Oliver is caught red-handed. Thinking quickly, Dodger grabs the watch instead and runs off with Oliver, but he escapes while Oliver is mistakenly identified as the thief. Dodger quietly hurries to court to try to rescue him, where Mr. Brownlow (the victim)'s niece, Rose, has testified for Oliver that he was not the boy, and Oliver refused to name the culprit. Rose offers Oliver to be a guest at their mansion in Grosvenor Square. There, he sees a portrait on the wall of the same lady his locket contains. When told it is Mr. Brownlow's late wife, and that they had one daughter who always carried a gold locket with that portrait, he and Rose realize that it means he may be Mr. Brownlow's grandson and her cousin. 
  
Meanwhile, Dodger manages to locate Oliver. Deciding that he knows too much about the group to be left on his own, Sikes convinces Fagin to let him kidnap Oliver with Dodger and Nancy's help. However, Nancy does so unwillingly, and Dodger refuses to put Oliver in the bag intended to be used for his abduction. Back at the hideout, Oliver confirms that he let nothing slip about the group, but tells Nancy that he loved the Brownlows. Nancy tries to return Oliver to the mansion, but is seen in the street by Sikes and forced to go back. Suspicious, Sikes hires Dodger to follow her the next day. Sikes later weasels out of Oliver that he knows where Fagin's treasure is kept. At night, he forces him to go to the Brownlow's to steal at gunpoint. Inside, Oliver purposely drops the bag of silver he's holding to wake Rose. Sikes and Oliver escape, but Mr. Brownlow sees Oliver, confirming his suspicion that he is a thief. Dodger encourages Oliver to escape if he gets the chance. 
   
The next day, Nancy goes to the Brownlows unknowingly followed by Dodger. She tells them of Oliver's abduction and agrees to return him at London Bridge at midnight. Dodger, threatened by Sikes, admits of overhearing the agreement. Still wanting Oliver to be free, he takes him to the bridge himself to throw Sikes off the trail. Unfortunately, Nancy, unaware of Dodger's plan, is murdered there by a furious Sikes who accuses her of double-crossing him. Meanwhile, Oliver has gone back to the hideout to retrieve his locket. Sikes walks in the door and sees the treasure. As he attempts to flee with it himself, Fagin arrives, followed by Dodger who stops Sikes, furious at Nancy's murder. Nancy's dead body has been found, and the police follow Sikes's dog to the hideout. Sikes locks the door, takes the box and Oliver (as a hostage) up to the roof, and leaves Dodger and Fagin below. On the roof, Oliver grabs the box from Sikes, who turns on him and slips. His neck gets caught in a coil of rope, and he is hung by the noose on the spot as the police watch. Dodger is arrested by them for his pilfering, and while Fagin negotiates with Oliver for the locket, ultimately returns it. The locket finally proves that Oliver is in fact Mr. Brownlow’s grandson by the matching of the portraits. After bidding a fond farewell to the arrested Dodger promising to see him again someday, Oliver is last seen sleeping happily in his new home.

Cast
 Richard Dreyfuss as Fagin
 Elijah Wood as The Artful Dodger
 David O'Hara as Bill Sikes
 Alex Trench as Oliver Twist
 Antoine Byrne as Nancy
 Olivia Caffrey as Rose Maylie
 Anthony Finigan as Mr. Brownlow
 Maria Charles as Widow Corney
 Des Braiden as Orphanage Magistrate
 Eileen Colgan as Mrs. Bedwin, the Brownlow's maid.
 Eilish Moore as Cook
 Lisa Dwan as Agnes, Oliver's mother.
 Conor Evans as Chief Constable
 A.J. Kennedy as Police Constable

References

External links
 
 
 
 

1997 television films
1997 films
Disney television films
American television films
Films based on Oliver Twist
Television shows based on Oliver Twist
Films about orphans
1997 drama films
Films directed by Tony Bill
Films scored by Van Dyke Parks